The National Democratic and Social Convention is a political party in Chad. 
At the last legislative elections, 21 April 2002, the party won according to IPU Parline 1 out of 155 seats.

Political parties in Chad